Fenchuganj Gas Field is a natural gas field located in Fenchuganj Upazila, Sylhet District, Bangladesh. This company is under the control of Bangladesh Petroleum Exploration and Production Company Limited (BAPEX).

Location
Fenchuganj gas field is located in Fenchuganj Upazila, Sylhet district.

See also 
List of natural gas fields in Bangladesh
Bangladesh Gas Fields Company Limited
Gas Transmission Company Limited

References 

1990 establishments in Bangladesh
Fenchuganj Upazila
Economy of Sylhet
Natural gas fields in Bangladesh